Vice (stylised as VICE) is a documentary TV series created and hosted by Shane Smith of Vice magazine. Produced by Bill Maher, it uses CNN journalist Fareed Zakaria as a consultant, and covers topics using an immersionist style of documentary filmmaking. It premiered on April 5, 2013, on HBO. The show's second season aired in 2014 and won an Emmy Award for Outstanding Informational Series or Special.

On May 7, 2014, HBO renewed the series for two more seasons. The 14-episode third season began March 6, 2015, one week after the hour-long "Killing Cancer" aired on February 27. Vice sixth season aired on April 6, 2018. On March 25, 2015, HBO announced Vice'''s renewal through Season 7.

The show's cancellation was announced on February 1, 2019, making the sixth season its last season on HBO. However, on September 24, the series was picked up by Showtime and resumed on March 29, 2020.

On July 30, 2020, the series was renewed for an eighth season that premiered on March 7, 2021.

On February 7, 2022, the series was renewed for a ninth and tenth season.

Synopsis
The show followed Vice journalists and founders Shane Smith and Suroosh Alvi, and segment hosts Ryan Duffy and Thomas Morton as they went to different parts of the world, interviewing people on political and cultural topics. Subjects included political assassinations, young weapons manufacturers, child suicide bombers, Indian and Pakistani border politics, the Chinese one-child policy, climate change, and bonded laborers in Pakistan's brick kilns, featuring the work of human and labor rights activist Syeda Ghulam Fatima.

Correspondents, crew
 Shane Smith – vice co-founder & CEO, executive producer
 Suroosh Alvi – vice co-founder, correspondent, executive producer
 Thomas Morton – correspondent
 Ben Anderson – correspondent and senior producer
 Vikram Gandhi – correspondent and producer
 Isobel Yeung – correspondent and producer
 Gianna Toboni – correspondent and producer
 Luke Wulf – correspondent and producer
 Hamilton Morris – correspondent and producer
 Ahmed Shihab-Eldin – correspondent
 Bill Maher – executive producer
 Eddy Moretti – executive producer
 Fareed Zakaria – consulting producer, executive producer
 BJ Levin – co-executive producer
 Alec MacRae – VP, Production
 Eric Weinrib – producer
 Kaj Larsen – correspondent
 Taylor Wilson – correspondent
 Aris Roussinos – correspondent
 Simon Ostrovsky – correspondent (2011–2014)

Production
The show was executive-produced by Bill Maher, Shane Smith, and Eddy Moretti, and used CNN journalist Fareed Zakaria as a consultant.

Release and reception
The first episode aired on HBO on April 5, 2013, and was available for free via YouTube. The series is the first televised program for VICE, featuring Vice staff as correspondents.

Politics, culture, and drugs are the main focuses of the Vice series. The show has received both positive and negative reviews because of its unique, provocative presentation and style. Some compare it to a gonzo type of journalism. Maureen Ryan of The Huffington Post wrote a negative review of the show, due to its presentation. Rolling Stone magazine has written that: "It feels a little like your buddy from the bar just happened to be wandering through eastern Afghanistan with a camera crew." In June 2013, the show was covered extensively in mainstream media for documenting a basketball game with North Korean dictator Kim Jong-un. Vice correspondents have filmed from the inside of crack-cooking kitchens in Atlanta to Haitian secret societies in talk of zombie powder. Following controversial topics is what makes Vice different from other news channels.

 Viceland 

A by-product for millennials called Viceland premiered on February 26, 2016. Oscar-winning filmmaker Spike Jonze was added to the Vice team as the network co-president for the production of Viceland. The series gives in-sights on weediquette, Action Bronson's food series, and the evangelic tent-revival scene in the South, and many more.

Vice News Tonight

A nightly spin-off called Vice News Tonight premiered on HBO on October 10, 2016. The program was relaunched in 2020 on the Vice cable network.

Series overview

See also
 The Vice Guide to Travel (2006)
 Rule Britannia'' (2009)

References

External links
 
 

2013 American television series debuts
2018 American television series endings
2020 American television series debuts
2010s American documentary television series
2020s American documentary television series
HBO original programming
HBO documentary films
Showtime (TV network) original programming
American television series revived after cancellation
Television series by CBS Studios
Television series by Warner Bros. Television Studios
Vice Media
Bill Maher